Timothy Sullivan (1835 – October 6, 1910) was a Union Navy sailor in the American Civil War and a recipient of the U.S. military's highest decoration, the Medal of Honor.

Born in 1835 in Ireland, Sullivan immigrated to the United States and was living in New York when he joined the U.S. Navy. Acting as a gun captain during battle, Sullivan showed "attention to duty, bravery, and coolness" through various engagements. For these actions, he was awarded the Medal of Honor on April 3, 1863.

Sullivan's official Medal of Honor citation reads:
Served on board the U.S.S. Louisville during various actions of that vessel. During the engagements of the Louisville, Sullivan served as first captain of a 9-inch gun and throughout his period of service was "especially commended for his attention to duty, bravery, and coolness in action."

Sullivan died on October 6, 1910, at age 74 or 75 and was buried at Los Angeles National Cemetery in Los Angeles, California.

References

External links 
  

1835 births
1910 deaths
Irish emigrants to the United States (before 1923)
Irish sailors in the United States Navy
People of New York (state) in the American Civil War
Union Navy sailors
Irish-born Medal of Honor recipients
United States Navy Medal of Honor recipients
American Civil War recipients of the Medal of Honor
Burials at Los Angeles National Cemetery